Sophie Taylor (born 2 February 1996) is a former international swimmer who swam breaststroke. She won a gold medal for England in the women's 100 metres breaststroke at the Commonwealth Games.

Personal life
Sophie Taylor was born on 2 February 1996 in Sheffield, Yorkshire. She lived in Harrogate, Yorkshire in 2014.

Swimming career

Taylor trains at the London Aquatics Centre, where she is coached by Lisa Bates.

At the Berlin International Swim Meet when Taylor 14 years old, (in 2010) she swam a personal best in the 100 metres breaststroke, and finished in third place to "show her potential". In 2012, her first domestic "breakthrough" was at the London held 2012 British Gas Swimming Championships, where she finished fourth. She soon performed at an international level, at the 2012 European Junior Swimming Championships in Antwerp, Belgium. This was Taylor's first European Junior Swimming Championships, but she ended with a silver medal and a bronze medal, from the 50 metres breaststroke and the 200 metres breaststroke respectively. Taylor finished in third place in the 50 metres, 100 metres, and 200 metres breaststroke in 2013 at the British Gas Swimming Championships. Later in the year, at the 2013 FINA World Junior Swimming Championships, she won another bronze, this time in the 200 metres breaststroke, but coupled with two silver medals in the 4 × 100 m Medley Relay, and the 100 metres breaststroke.

On 28 July 2014, Taylor won the women's 100 metres breaststroke at the 2014 Commonwealth Games in Glasgow, Scotland with a time of 1 minute and 06.35 seconds, a "massive British record". She broke the previous record, which she had set herself. For much of the race Taylor was just behind leader Alia Atkinson, but a sprint in the last half length meant that Taylor finished first, Australian Lorna Tonks finished second, 0.99 seconds behind, and Jamaican Atkinson third, 1.79 seconds behind Taylor.

On 17 July 2015 Taylor announced she was taking a break from competitive swimming, and withdrew from all events at the 2015 World Aquatics Championships. Taylor has not competed domestically or internationally since that date, and indicated she has retired from elite competition.

References

1996 births
Living people
English female swimmers
British female swimmers
Female breaststroke swimmers
Sportspeople from Sheffield
Commonwealth Games gold medallists for England
Swimmers at the 2014 Commonwealth Games
Commonwealth Games medallists in swimming
20th-century English women
21st-century English women
Medallists at the 2014 Commonwealth Games